The Taipei Metro Houshanpi station is a station on the Bannan line located on the border of the Xinyi and Nangang districts, Taipei, Taiwan. It opened for service on 30 December 2000, as part of an eastern extension to Kunyang.

Station overview
The two-level, underground station and has one island platform and four exits. It is located beneath Zhongxiao East Rd.

Station layout

Exits

Exit 1: Zhongpo N. Rd.
Exit 2: Yucheng Park
Exit 3: Zhongxiao Hospital 
Exit 4: Yongji Rd.

Around the station

Wufenpu
Taipei City Hospital
Yucheng Park
Youde High School
Chengde Elementary School (between this station and Kunyang station)
Chengde Junior High School
Yongchun Elementary School (between this station and Yongchun station)
Yongji Elementary School
Raohe Street Night Market

References

Bannan line stations
Railway stations opened in 2000